Sir John Richard Robinson (2 November 1828 – 30 November 1903) was an English journalist, manager and editor of the Daily News.

Life

Born on 2 November 1828 at Witham, Essex, he was the second son of eight children of Richard Robinson, a congregational minister. His wife Sarah was the daughter of John Dennant, also a congregational minister, of Halesworth, Suffolk. At eleven he entered the school for the sons of congregational ministers at Lewisham. Withdrawn from school on 26 June 1843, he was apprenticed to a firm of booksellers at Shepton Mallet. His first effort towards journalism was a descriptive account (in the Daily News 14 February 1846) of a meeting of Wiltshire labourers to protest against the Corn Laws. After reporting for the Bedford Mercury, he obtained a post on the Wiltshire Independent at Devizes, and sent regular reports of the local markets to the Daily News.

In 1848 Robinson went to London. Having become a unitarian, he was made sub-editor of a Unitarian journal, The Inquirer, and did most of the work for John Lalor, the editor. His next post was on the Weekly News and Chronicle, under John Sheehan, and in 1855 he became editor of the Express, an evening paper under the same management as the Daily News. At the same time he was a prolific contributor elsewhere. He followed the revolutionary movements of Europe, and was in contact with Giuseppe Mazzini after writing an appreciation. He also knew Lajos Kossuth, Giuseppe Garibaldi, and other leaders.

In 1868, when the price of the Daily News was reduced to one penny, Robinson was appointed manager, and turned the paper around. He saw that the public demanded news not only quickly but in an attractive form. At the opening of the Franco-Prussian War he instructed his correspondents to telegraph descriptive details and not merely bare facts, and after the war was in progress he brought in Archibald Forbes, who became a valuable contributor. At the prompting of another correspondent, John Edwin Hilary Skinner, he started the "French Peasants Relief Fund", which reached a total of £20,000.

On 16 June 1876 Edwin Pears of Constantinople contributed to the Daily News the first of a series of letters, which appeared on 23 June, describing the Batak massacre and other atrocities. Robinson sent out an American journalist, Januarius Aloysius MacGahan, who was accompanied by Eugene Schuyler, the American consul-general in Turkey, to make inquiries. Pears's charges were corroborated. In 1887 Robinson became titular editor, the actual night editing being carried on chiefly by Peter William Clayden. In 1893 he was knighted on the recommendation of William Ewart Gladstone. The fortunes of the News meanwhile declined. During the Second Boer War in South Africa (1899–1902), Robinson's sympathies were with the Boers. The proprietors changed the policy of the paper to a support of the war, without restoring its prosperity. Then the policy was again reversed by new proprietors, but Robinson resigned in February 1901.

Robinson died at his home in Addison Crescent, Kensington, London on 30 November 1903, and was buried on the eastern side of Highgate Cemetery.

Associations
Robinson was a Reform Club member, and associated with the circle of James Payn, William Black, Sir Wemyss Reid, and George Augustus Sala. He was a regular "first night" visitor to theatres. In 1854 he became a professional member of the Guild of Literature and Art, a society which was founded by Charles Dickens and his friends for the benefit of authors and artists. The guild failed, however, to fulfil the aims of its founders, and Robinson with Frederick Clifford, as the last surviving trustees, arranged for its dissolution in 1897. In 1897 he was chairman of the Newspaper Press Fund dinner, and in 1898 of the Newspaper Society dinner; the former body represented journalists, and the latter proprietors.

Family
Robinson married on 14 July 1859 Jane Mapes (died 11th July, 1876), youngest daughter of William Granger of the Grange, Wickham Bishops, Essex; by her he had one son and one daughter. He was also a paternal uncle of the notable British writer and journalist, Bertram Fletcher Robinson.

Notes

See also
 Edwin Pears
 Januarius MacGahan
Attribution

1828 births
1903 deaths
Burials at Highgate Cemetery
English male journalists
English newspaper editors
People from Witham
English male non-fiction writers
Knights Bachelor